Michael Carpenter was an American politician. He served as the fifth mayor of Lancaster, Pennsylvania from 1843 to 1851.

References

Mayors of Lancaster, Pennsylvania